Talvin (also Romanized as Talvīn) is a village in Nardin Rural District, Kalpush District, Meyami County, Semnan Province, Iran. At the 2006 census, its population was 1,875, in 499 families.

References 

Populated places in Meyami County